Railroad Gap Creek is a stream in the U.S. state of Oregon. It is a tributary to Evans Creek.

Railroad Gap Creek was named in the 1870s for a mountain pass in its headwaters.

References

Rivers of Oregon
Rivers of Jackson County, Oregon